The Wales national netball team represents Wales in international netball competition.
The Welsh Netball Association, the governing body for netball in Wales, is responsible for Welsh squad selection, international matches and for the training and development of players.

Wales' current International Netball Federation (INF) world ranking is ninth, as of 2 December 2019.

Players

2018 Wales Netball Commonwealth Games Squad

Competitive history

See also
 Sport in Wales
 Netball in Europe

References

External links
Welsh Netball Association

    
National netball teams of Europe
Netball
1949 establishments in Wales